Ilya Aleksandrovich Gruznov (born 5 February 1997) is a Russian football player. He plays for FC Shinnik Yaroslavl.

Club career
He made his debut in the Russian Football National League for FC Fakel Voronezh on 10 July 2021 in a game against FC Baltika Kaliningrad.

References

External links
 
 Profile by Russian Football National League

1997 births
People from Talovsky District
Sportspeople from Voronezh Oblast
Living people
Russian footballers
Association football forwards
FC Mashuk-KMV Pyatigorsk players
FC Ararat Moscow players
FC Urozhay Krasnodar players
FC Fakel Voronezh players
FC Shinnik Yaroslavl players
Russian Second League players
Russian First League players